WMTD (1380 kHz) is a classic hits formatted broadcast radio station licensed to Hinton, West Virginia, serving Metro Hinton.  WMTD is owned and operated by MountainPlex Media.

Translator
WMTD relays its programming to an FM translator is order to improve coverage, especially at night when the AM frequency reduces power to only 13 watts.  The translator also gives the advantage of FM broadcasting with its improved high fidelity stereophonic sound.  The 98.3 frequency is in fact the primary branding used on the station logo.

External links
Classic Hits 98.3 WMTD Online
Classic Hits 98.3 WMTD on Facebook

MTD
Radio stations established in 1963
1963 establishments in West Virginia